Penticton Herald  is a local newspaper in Penticton, British Columbia founded in 1906 by W.J. Clement.  It was first known as Penticton Press and later changed to Penticton Herald in 1910. The Herald also publishes the Entertainment NOW TV Guide and Showcase Real Estate Guide. It is owned by Continental Newspapers Canada Ltd.

See also
List of newspapers in Canada

References

External links
Penticton Herald – official website
 

Continental Newspapers
Penticton
Newspapers established in 1906
Mass media in the Okanagan
Daily newspapers published in British Columbia
1906 establishments in British Columbia